Paolo Seppani (born 18 August 1986 in Giuliano di Roma, Frosinone) is an Italian football (soccer) defender. He currently plays for Città di Anagni Calcio.

He also has played for A.S. Roma, after having played the first half of the 2006/2007 season with Frosinone Calcio.

Seppani played for Pol. Val di Sangro in Serie C2 during the 2007-08 season.

References

1986 births
Living people
Sportspeople from the Province of Frosinone
Italian footballers
A.S. Roma players
Frosinone Calcio players
Association football midfielders
Footballers from Lazio